National Tertiary Route 301, is a road between San Ignacio district in San José province and Parrita in the Puntarenas province.

Description

The route starts at the intersection with Route 209 that crosses the San Ignacio district, and goes south and downward to the Pacific Ocean, traversing the communities of Cangrejal, Sabanillas, Bijagual and Surubres, then finally arrives at its intersection with Route 34. It is currently as of December 2019, a gravel road.

History

Future developments

In December 2019 there was an announcement by the central government that the road would be paved with asphalt. Designs will be drafter through 2020, with works starting at the end of the same year, with a projected cost of CRC ₡5,100,000,000.

References

Highways in Costa Rica